Perry Baker (born June 29, 1986) is an American rugby sevens player for the United States national rugby sevens team. With over 250 tries, Baker currently ranks first among Americans and third among all players in career tries scored in the World Series.

Baker has established himself as one of the best rugby sevens players in the world. In the 2015–16 World Series, Baker ranked second with 48 tries scored and was one of seven players named to the World Series Dream Team. In the 2016–17 World Series, Baker ranked first with 57 tries scored, was again named to the World Series Dream Team, and won the 2017 and 2018 World Rugby Sevens Player of the Year award.

American football
Baker played college football for NCAA Division II Fairmont State University in West Virginia. He graduated from Fairmont State in 2010 with a degree in Criminal Justice.

Baker was signed by the Philadelphia Eagles of the National Football League (NFL) in July 2011, but he suffered a knee injury that cut short his NFL career.
Baker played two seasons for the Pittsburgh Power of the Arena Football League from 2012 to 2013.

Rugby career

Early career
Baker was introduced to rugby by one of Baker's former high school football coaches in 2006. Baker played with the Daytona Beach Coconuts in 2012, leading them to a ninth-place finish at the club sevens national tournament.
Baker took up rugby full-time in 2013 and joined the Tiger Rugby Academy in Columbus, Ohio, working under coach Paul Holmes.

U.S. national team

2014–16
Baker signed a full-time contract with the U.S. Eagles in July 2014 to join the residency program at the U.S. Olympic Training Center in San Diego, California.
Baker made his debut at the 2014 Gold Coast Sevens in Australia, where he entered the U.S. team's first match against Canada as a second-half substitute. Baker's first start and first try came in the U.S. team's third match of that tournament, against Argentina; he scored his first hat-trick also in that tournament, in the knockout rounds against Portugal.

Baker played an instrumental role in the U.S. team's first-ever victory over New Zealand, scoring both tries in their 14-12 victory at the 2015 Dubai Sevens. During the 2015-16 World Rugby Sevens Series Baker scored 48 tries during the season, a record high for a US player. Baker was second only to South Africa's Seabelo Senatla in tries for the season, and Baker earned a place on the World Rugby dream team for the 2015-16 season.

Baker was a member of the United States men's rugby team at the 2016 Summer Olympics in Rio. He scored a try in the second half of the team's final pool match against Fiji.  The team did not advance past pool play.

2016–2020
Baker had a productive 2016–17 season. At the 2016 South Africa Sevens, in the absence of regular captain Madison Hughes, Baker was named U.S. team captain for the tournament. At the 2017 Singapore Sevens, Baker ran 100 meters from his own in-goal area to score a try against Wales, which was voted by World Rugby as one of the tries of the tournament; in the match against Scotland Baker beat four defenders to set up a try for Stephen Tomasin, which was also voted as one of the best tries of the 2017 Singapore Sevens tournament. At the 2017 Paris Sevens Baker scored another length-of-the-field try, which was voted one of the best tries of the tournament. Baker finished the 2016-17 World Series with 57 tries, more than any other player. Baker’s accomplishments were recognized by World Rugby. He was one of seven players named to the 2017 World Series Dream Team. He received the 2017 World Rugby Sevens Player of the Year award, beating out Fiji’s Jerry Tuwai and South Africa’s Roscko Specman.

Baker started slowly in the 2017–18 season, missing almost all of the first two tournaments due to a concussion. Baker was an important part of the U.S. victory at the 2018 USA Sevens, the team's first tournament win on home soil. Baker scored all of the team's three tries in the 17–12 quarterfinal win over England. In the semifinal against Fiji with the U.S. down 0–7 at halftime, Baker sparked the team with two second-half tries for a 19–7 comeback win. In the final against Argentina, Baker opened the scoring with a try en route to a 28–0 victory. Baker was leading all players in tries scored for the 2017–18 season before a shoulder injury cause him to miss the last few tournaments of the season.

Baker had a quiet 2018-19 season, missing several tournaments due to injury.

On February 29, 2020, Baker became the second USA player, after his teammate Carlin Isles, to score 200 tries. He completed this feat in a 33–12 victory match against Scotland during the 2019-20 World Rugby Sevens Series in Los Angeles.

2022 
Baker represented the United States at the 2022 Rugby World Cup Sevens in Cape Town.

Season by season

Family
Baker's older brother Dallas is a National Football League, Arena Football League and Canadian Football League player.
Perry is the nephew of former NFL player and coach Wes Chandler.

References

External links
 Perry Baker at USA Rugby
 
 
 
 
 

1986 births
Living people
African-American players of American football
American football wide receivers
American rugby union players
United States international rugby sevens players
Fairmont State Fighting Falcons football players
People from New Smyrna Beach, Florida
Philadelphia Eagles players
Pittsburgh Power players
Players of American football from Florida
Olympic rugby sevens players of the United States
Rugby sevens players at the 2016 Summer Olympics
Pan American Games medalists in rugby sevens
Pan American Games bronze medalists for the United States
World Rugby Awards winners
Olympic rugby sevens players of the National Football League
Rugby sevens players at the 2015 Pan American Games
Medalists at the 2015 Pan American Games
Rugby sevens players at the 2020 Summer Olympics
21st-century African-American sportspeople
20th-century African-American people